The 16535 / 16536 Gol Gumbaz Express is a good patronage Express train, which was serving from the metre-gauge era between Bengaluru City, Karnataka, and Solapur City in Maharastra. Now it is a daily Express train running between Mysore and Solapur via , Arsikere, Davanagere, Hubli, Gadag, Bagalkot and Vijayapura. Numbered 16535/36 the train is an Express train of Indian Railways of South Western Railway Zone, Bangalore Division.

Relevance
The train is named after the famous Gol Gumbaz, a historical monument located in Vijayapura. It is an important train which connects North Karnataka with Bangalore. This train covers important districts of Karnataka which includes Mysore, Bangalore, Tumkur from South Karnataka and Haveri, Dharwad, Gadag, Bagalkot, Vijayapura from North Karnataka.

Route & Halts

Schedule
 16536 Gol Gumbaz Express leaves Solapur at 14:10 IST, arrive at 06:50 IST at Yeshwantpur, 07:25 IST at Bangalore City and 10:45 IST at Mysore with an average speed of 48km/hr
 16535 Gol Gumbaz Express leaves Mysore at 15:45 IST, arrive Bangalore City at 6:35 IST, Yeshwantpur at 19:06 IST and leave for Solapur at 19:07 IST with an average speed of 47km/hr.

Traction

Rake sharing
This train shares its rakes with 16591/16592 Hampi Express.

Direction reversal
The train reverses its direction 2 times at;

External links
 16535/Gol Gumbaz Express India Rail Info

Transport in Mysore
Transport in Solapur
Railway services introduced in 2009
Named passenger trains of India
Rail transport in Karnataka
Rail transport in Maharashtra
Express trains in India